James Joseph Disney (20 November 1859 – 24 June 1934) was an English cricketer who played first-class cricket for Derbyshire as wicket-keeper between 1881 and 1890.

Disney was born in Butterley near Ripley, Derbyshire and became a plumber as his main career. He played for twenty-three Colts of England against the MCC in 1881 and in that year made his debut for Derbyshire in a victory against Sussex setting his place as wicket keeper for the club.

In the 1882 season, he continued to keep wicket, although as a batsman he found himself getting out cheaply. Derbyshire played host to the touring Australians, and  Disney found himself out to the bowling of Eugene Palmer on two occasions. He played a full season in 1883 but in 1884 Disney took a year out of the side, when Thomas Mycroft filled the wicket-keeping slot. He returned in 1885, when he was once again a first-team pick. Disney remained a force as a wicket-keeper and    continued playing for Derbyshire until 1890, although the club lost first-class status in 1887. In 1888 he was called in as wicket keeper for an England XI in a match against a team of Australians building up to the third match of a Test series. He played his last season for Derbyshire in 1890 to be replaced by William Storer. In 1893 he started playing for Cheshire where he stayed until 1901. He played a final first-class game was for Liverpool & District in 1894.

Disney kept wicket in 57 first-class matches taking 87 catches and stumping twelve times. He was a right-handed batsman and played 101 first-class innings with an average of 5.30 and a top score of 27 not out.

Disney died in Ripley aged 74.

References

1859 births
1934 deaths
English cricketers
Derbyshire cricketers
North v South cricketers
Players cricketers
Cheshire cricketers
Liverpool and District cricketers
Wicket-keepers